Carl von Essen (18 October 1940 – 11 November 2021) was a Swedish fencer and Olympic champion. He competed at the 1976 Summer Olympics in Montreal, where he won a gold medal in épée with the Swedish team.

Von Essen died in Björnlunda on 11 November 2021, at the age of 81.

References

1940 births
2021 deaths
People from Jönköping
Swedish male épée fencers
Olympic fencers of Sweden
Fencers at the 1968 Summer Olympics
Fencers at the 1972 Summer Olympics
Fencers at the 1976 Summer Olympics
Olympic gold medalists for Sweden
Olympic medalists in fencing
Medalists at the 1976 Summer Olympics
Sportspeople from Jönköping County
20th-century Swedish people
21st-century Swedish people
Djurgårdens IF fencers